GEIE EuroTorp is a consortium formed in July 1993 by French and Italian defense companies. Concerned governments signed a memorandum of understanding on industrial co-operation on their new generation lightweight torpedo programs.

Member companies of GEIE EuroTorp are:
Whitehead Alenia Sistemi Subacquei S.p.A. (WASS) (50%)
Naval Group (previously DCNS Group), for and on behalf of DCNS (26%) through DCN/SC/Stz
Thales (24%) through Thales Underwater Systems

Tasks of EuroTorp are to develop, manufacture and market:
the French-Italian new generation MU90/IMPACT lightweight torpedo
the lightweight A244/S torpedo
associated torpedo launching systems and logistic support

In addition to its programme management and commercial role, EuroTorp is also responsible for achieving compliance with operational specifications, integration on launching platforms and new systems development such as Hard Kill and submarine-launched versions.

External links
EuroTorp

Technology consortia
Technology companies established in 1993
Defence companies of Italy
Defence companies of France
Italian companies established in 1993
French companies established in 1993
Companies based in Provence-Alpes-Côte d'Azur